Boron arsenide (or Arsenic boride) is a chemical compound involving boron and arsenic, usually with a chemical formula BAs. Other boron arsenide compounds are known, such as the subarsenide . Chemical synthesis of cubic BAs is very challenging and its single crystal forms usually have defects.

Properties
BAs is a cubic (sphalerite) semiconductor in the III-V family with a lattice constant of 0.4777 nm and an indirect band gap of 1.82 eV. Cubic BAs is reported to decompose to the subarsenide B12As2 at temperatures above 920 °C. Boron arsenide has a melting point of 2076 °C. The thermal conductivity of BAs is very high: around 1300 W/(m·K) at 300 K.

The basic physical properties of cubic BAs have been experimentally measured: Band gap (1.82 eV), optical refractive index (3.29 at wavelength 657 nm), elastic modulus (326 GPa), shear modulus, Poisson's ratio, thermal expansion coefficient (3.85×10−6/K), and heat capacity. It can be alloyed with gallium arsenide to produce ternary and quaternary semiconductors.

BAs has high electron and hole mobility, >1000 cm2/V/second, unlike silicon which has high electron mobility, but low hole mobility.

It has been reported that subjected to high high pressure BAs decrease its thermal conductivity contrary to the typical increase seen in most materials.

Boron subarsenide
Boron arsenide also occurs as subarsenides, including the icosahedral boride . It belongs to Rm space group with a rhombohedral structure based on clusters of boron atoms and two-atom As–As chains. It is a wide-bandgap semiconductor (3.47 eV) with the extraordinary ability to "self-heal" radiation damage. This form can be grown on substrates such as silicon carbide. Another use for solar cell fabrication was proposed, but it is not currently used for this purpose.

Applications
Boron arsenide is most attractive for use in electronics thermal management. Experimental integration with gallium nitride transistors to form GaN-BAs heterostructures has been demonstrated and shows better performance than the best GaN HEMT devices on silicon carbide or diamond substrates. Manufacturing BAs composites was developed as highly conducting and flexible thermal interfaces.

First-principles calculations have predicted that the thermal conductivity of cubic BAs is remarkably high, over 2,200 W/(m·K) at room temperature, which is comparable to that of diamond and graphite. Subsequent measurements yielded a value of only 190 W/(m·K) due to the high density of defects. More recent first-principles calculations incorporating four-phonon scattering predict a thermal conductivity of 1400 W/(m·K). Later, defect-free boron arsenide crystals have been experimentally realized and measured with an ultrahigh thermal conductivity of 1300 W/(m·K), consistent with theory predictions. Crystals with small density of defects have shown thermal conductivity of 900–1000 W/(m·K).

The cubic-shaped boron arsenide has been discovered to be better at conducting heat and electricity than silicon, as well as reportedly better than silicon at conducting both electrons and its positively charged counterpart, the "electron-hole."

References

External links
 2020 paper by Malica and Dal Corso - Temperature dependent elastic constants and thermodynamic properties of BAs: An ab initio investigation
Matweb data

 High ambipolar mobility in cubic boron arsenide, Science

Boron compounds
Arsenides
III-V compounds
III-V semiconductors
Zincblende crystal structure
B